Fareway Stores, Inc. is a Midwest grocery store chain based in Boone, Iowa. It operates 131 grocery store locations in Iowa, Illinois, Minnesota, Nebraska, South Dakota, Kansas, and Missouri.  

Fareway provides service and food distribution in the Midwest.

Some Fareway stores open as early as 7:00 a.m. and stay open as late as 9:00 p.m., but all are closed on Sundays and open until 5:00 p.m. on major holidays.

In December 2018, Fareway announced a new plan to help eligible full-time employees pay off their student loan debt. This benefit gives $100 a month with an upper limit of $5,000 total. This adds Fareway Stores, Inc. to the roughly four percent of companies across the nation that offer employee benefits concerning student loan debt.

References

Boone, Iowa
Privately held companies based in Iowa
Economy of the Midwestern United States
Supermarkets of the United States
Retail companies established in 1938
1938 establishments in Iowa